Calliostoma circus is a species of sea snail, a marine gastropod mollusc in the family Calliostomatidae.

Description

Distribution

References

External links

circus
Gastropods described in 1969